Reza Yazdani (born August 25, 1984 in Juybar, Iran) nicknamed The Leopard of Juybar, is an Iranian wrestler and two time World Champion, who won Gold in the 2011 World Wrestling Championships and 2013 World Wrestling Championships in the 96 kg division.

He also won the gold medal in 2006 Asian Games in the 84 kg division and the gold medal in 2010 Asian Games in the 96 kg division, as well as the gold medal in 2014 Asian Games in 97 kg division. He competed in the London 2012 Olympics and also defeated Abdusalam Gadisov, but was injured in the semi-final, versus his Ukrainian competitor, Valeriy Andriytsev. Yazdani came back from injury for the 2013 World Wrestling Championships in Budapest, where he won the gold medal in the 96 kg division by defeating khetag Gazyumov of Azerbaijan in the finals by the score of 4-2.

See also

 List of World and Olympic Champions in men's freestyle wrestling

References

External links
Profile (2006 Asian Games Website)
J. Foeldeak GmbH - Sports Mats, Wrestling Mats, Judo Mats, Grappling Mats
 

1984 births
Living people
Iranian male sport wrestlers
Olympic wrestlers of Iran
Wrestlers at the 2008 Summer Olympics
Wrestlers at the 2012 Summer Olympics
Wrestlers at the 2016 Summer Olympics
Asian Games gold medalists for Iran
Asian Games medalists in wrestling
Wrestlers at the 2006 Asian Games
Wrestlers at the 2010 Asian Games
Wrestlers at the 2014 Asian Games
People from Juybar
World Wrestling Championships medalists
Medalists at the 2006 Asian Games
Medalists at the 2010 Asian Games
Medalists at the 2014 Asian Games
Asian Wrestling Championships medalists
Sportspeople from Mazandaran province
20th-century Iranian people
21st-century Iranian people
World Wrestling Champions